Ignacio Calle Tobón (21 August 1931 – 24 February 1982) was a Colombian footballer. He was part of the squad for the Colombia national football team at the 1962 FIFA World Cup which was held in Chile after playing in qualification games for the 1958 and 1962 tournament.

Career
Born in Medellin, Calle played all his career for Atlético Nacional. He was also a successful manager for Santa Fe and América de Cali.

References

1931 births
1982 deaths
Colombian footballers
Colombia international footballers
1962 FIFA World Cup players
Categoría Primera A players
Independiente Medellín footballers
Atlético Nacional footballers
Association football defenders
Footballers from Cali